Red Alert or red alert may refer to:

Alert states
 Red alert, a high alert state
 Red Alert, the "attack imminent" alert signal for the US civil defense siren
 Red alert state, the most serious alert state in the UK BIKINI state system
 Red Alert (more commonly known as "Red Color"), an early warning civil defense siren for the Israel Defense Forces

Film and television
Red Alert (film), a 1977 TV film 
Red Alert: The War Within, a 2010 Indian film
Red Alert (game show), a British TV game show
Red Alert, TV programs in the Pinoy True Stories series

Gaming
Red Alert (arcade game)
Last Alert, a 1989 shoot 'em up game known as Red Alert in Europe and Japan
Command & Conquer: Red Alert (series), a series of real-time strategy video games
Command & Conquer: Red Alert, the first game in the series
Red Alert (Transformers), several characters in Transformers series

Music
 Red Alert (band), a British band formed in 1979

Albums
 Red Alert (Agent 51 album) (1998)
 Red Alert (Red Garland album) (1978)
 Red Alert, a 2004 album by Sizzla
 Red Alert, a 2002 album by Warp 11

Songs
 "Red Alert" (song), a 1999 song by Basement Jaxx
 "Red Alert", a 2019 song by KSI and Randolph from New Age
 "Red Alert", a 1984 song by Quiet Riot from Condition Critical

Other uses 
Red Alert (novel), a 1958 novel by Peter George
Red Alert, a fictional organization in Mega Man X7
Redd Alert, an Indigenous street and prison gang in Canada

See also
 Amber alert, a child abduction emergency alert
 General quarters
 Homeland Security Advisory System, with a "Severe (Red)" threat level
 Kool DJ Red Alert (born 1956), American disc jockey